John Bobo (born March 18, 1958) is a former American football player and coach.  He served as the head football coach at Arkansas State University from 1993 to 1996, compiling a record of 13–30–1.

Head coaching record

References

1958 births
Living people
American football defensive ends
American football tight ends
Arkansas State Red Wolves football coaches
Alabama Crimson Tide football coaches
Louisville Cardinals football coaches
Maryville Scots football players
Tampa Bay Buccaneers coaches